is a Shinto shrine in the Osaki neighborhood of the city of Hōfu in Yamaguchi Prefecture, Japan. It is the ichinomiya of former Suo Province. The main festival of the shrine is held annually on the Saturday & Sunday nearest September 25.

Enshrined kami
The kami enshrined at Tamanooya Jinja are:
 , the son of Ninigi and the creator of the Yasakani no Magatama.
 , the goddess of mirrors and stonecutters, and creator of the Yata no Kagami.

History
The origins of Tamanooya Jinja are unknown. Although there is no documentary evidence, it is believed that it began as the family shrine for a clan of Kofun period craftsmen who made magatama and tubular beads, who regarded Tamanooya-no-Mikoto as their ancestor. In the Nihon Shoki, when the legendary Emperor Keikō led an expedition to conquer the Kumaso, he was created by a clan headed by Princess Kamikashi, who offered him sacred treasures, and he prayed at the Tamanooya Jinja for victory. The shrine is mentioned in the "Nihon Sandai Jitsuroku" and Engishiki records from the early Heian period, and was regarded as the ichinomiya of the province from this time.

During the Kamakura period, the monk Chōgen who visited the Saba River basin to procure materials for the reconstruction of reconstruction of Tōdai-ji and from March 1186 the province donated substantial portion of its revenues to the project. When the reconstruction was completed in 1195, Chōgen rebuilt the Tamanooya Jinja as a gesture of thanksgiving, and the shrine has preserved the  written by Chōgen listing the work accomplished. This document is noteworthy as the most credible example of Chōgen's handwriting and is a National Important Cultural Property.

During the Meiji period era of State Shinto, the shrine was rated as a  under the Modern system of ranked Shinto Shrines

The shrine is located a 45-minute walk from Hōfu Station on the JR West Sanyō Main Line.

Gallery

See also
List of Shinto shrines
Ichinomiya

References
 Plutschow, Herbe. Matsuri: The Festivals of Japan. RoutledgeCurzon (1996) 
 Ponsonby-Fane, Richard Arthur Brabazon. (1959).  The Imperial House of Japan. Kyoto: Ponsonby Memorial Society. OCLC 194887

External links

Hofu Tourist information

Notes

Shinto shrines in Yamaguchi Prefecture
Suo Province
Hōfu, Yamaguchi
Ichinomiya